Make Your Own Murder Party is a 1986 role-playing video game.

Gameplay 
The host of the murder mystery party inputs a series of data about their party guests, and the game automatically generates a mystery with a murder, motives, and a series of clues. These are all able to be printed as player booklets. The game is also able to print invites for the guests, and offers advice on how to host the perfect murder mystery. Once the booklets have been printed out, the game becomes purely physical like a normal murder mystery party; the game simply allows a streamlined process to generate a mystery.

Reception 
Compute!'s Gazette approved of the computer not being needed for the party after Make Your Own Murder Partys use. Kiplinger's Personal Finance noted the game's usefulness in helping a host prepare and organise a game, due to "meticulous planning" being crucial in a murder mystery party being successful.

James Trunzo reviewed the game for Computer Gaming World, and stated that "Electronic Arts has produced yet another product worthy of your attention."

References

External links 
 Tilt review (French)

1986 video games
Apple II games
Commodore 64 games
DOS games
Electronic Arts games
Role-playing video games
Video games developed in the United States